James Melkonian (born April 6, 1961) is an American screenwriter and film director. He wrote and directed the films The Stoned Age (aka: Tack's Chicks) and The Jerky Boys: The Movie. Melkonian is also an advertising writer, producer and director.

Filmography (as writer and director)
 The Stoned Age (1994)
 The Jerky Boys: The Movie (1995)

References

External links 
 

American people of Armenian descent
American male screenwriters
American film directors
Living people
1961 births